USS Stettin was a 600-ton iron screw steamship, was built at Sunderland, England, in 1861 and later served as a gunboat in the United States Navy during the American Civil War.

Capture of the English steamship Stettin
The Stettin was captured by the Union side wheel steamer  on 24 May 1862 northeast of Charleston Bar while attempting to break through the Federal blockade of Charleston, South Carolina. The blockade runner had been attempting to slip into Charleston with saltpeter, lead, quinine, and assorted cargo from the Bahamas. Condemned by the New York Prize Court, the steamer was purchased by the United States Navy on 4 September, and placed in commission as USS Stettin in November. Acting Master Edward F. Devens was in command.

Union blockade enforcement
Assigned to the South Atlantic Blockading Squadron, Stettin arrived at Port Royal, South Carolina, on 24 November 1862, and was sent back to the waters off Charleston to help enforce the blockade. While so assigned, she captured, or had a role in capturing or destroying, four would be blockade runners. On 28 March 1863, she captured , and  shelled steamer Havelock as the blockade runner raced past them off Charleston on 11 June. Their guns damaged Havelock so severely that she ran aground on Folly Island where she was seen at daybreak ablaze. She was later reported to be a total wreck. The Stettin operated successfully against the steamer Diamond on 23 September 1863 to achieve a fourth victory.

Decommissioning
USS Stettin left the war zone late in the conflict and was decommissioned at the Boston Navy Yard on 6 April 1865. She was sold at a public auction on 22 June to Richard Baker Jr, and renamed Sheridan. She was stranded on 24 September 1866.

See also

 Blockade runners of the American Civil War
 Blockade mail of the Confederacy

References

External links 
 Stettin (English Steamship, 1861) - Served as USS Stettin in 1862-1865

Ships of the Union Navy
Steamships of the United States Navy
Gunboats of the United States Navy
American Civil War patrol vessels of the United States
Shipwrecks
Maritime incidents in September 1866
1861 ships